Davor Matijaš (born 23 August 1999) is a Croatian professional footballer who plays as a goalkeeper for Challenger Pro League club Beerschot.

Club career
A youth academy product of Hajduk Split, Matijaš has made more than 20 appearances for club's reserve team in Druga HNL.

Matijaš joined Belgian club Royal Antwerp in January 2020. He made his professional debut on 1 August 2020 in final of 2019–20 Belgian Cup. He played all 90 minutes and kept a clean sheet in the game, as his side won 1–0 against Club Brugge.

On 20 August 2022, Matijaš joined Challenger Pro League club Beerschot on a two-year deal until June 2024.

International career
Matijaš is a former Croatian youth international. He has played for seven different age group teams of Croatia.

Career statistics

Club

Honours
Royal Antwerp
Belgian Cup: 2019–20

References

External links

 

1999 births
Living people
Footballers from Split, Croatia
Association football goalkeepers
Croatian footballers
Croatia youth international footballers
Croatia under-21 international footballers
HNK Hajduk Split II players
NK Primorac 1929 players
Royal Antwerp F.C. players
K Beerschot VA players
First Football League (Croatia) players
Croatian expatriate footballers
Expatriate footballers in Belgium
Croatian expatriate sportspeople in Belgium